The New Zealand women's national squash team represents New Zealand in international squash team competitions, and is governed by Squash New Zealand.

Since 1981, New Zealand has participated in two finals of the World Squash Team Open.

Current team
 Joelle King
 Amanda Landers-Murphy
 Megan Craig
 Kylie Lindsay
 Rebecca Barnett

Results

World Team Squash Championships

See also 
 Squash New Zealand
 World Team Squash Championships
 New Zealand men's national squash team

References

External links 
 Team New Zealand

Squash teams
Women's national squash teams
Squash
Squash in New Zealand